The 2001–02 Russian Superleague season was the sixth season of the Russian Superleague, the top level of ice hockey in Russia. 18 teams participated in the league, and Lokomotiv Yaroslavl won the championship.

Standings

Playoffs

3rd place: Metallurg Magnitogorsk – Avangard Omsk 1:1, 2:0

External links
Season on hockeyarchives.ru

Russian Superleague seasons
1